Aditya Singh Rajput is an Indian television actor, who has done various TV commercials and roles in Hindi television shows and Bollywood films.

Career
Aditya rajput started his career aged 11.

Works
 Films
 2008 – Aadi King
 2010 – Mom And Dad: The lifeline love
 2016 - Lovers 
 Television

References

External links

1986 births
Living people
Indian male television actors
Male actors in Hindi television
Indian male film actors